Saint-Camille-de-Lellis is a parish in the Les Etchemins Regional County Municipality in Quebec, Canada. It is part of the Chaudière-Appalaches region and the population is 752 as of the Canada 2016 Census. It is named after Saint Camillus de Lellis, but also commemorates Reverend Camille-Stanislas Brochu, first priest of the parish.

Saint-Camille-de-Lellis lies on the Canada–United States border.

Demographics 

References

Commission de toponymie du Québec
Ministère des Affaires municipales, des Régions et de l'Occupation du territoire

See also 

 Daaquam River, a stream
 Orignaux River (Black River), a stream
 Black River (Daaquam River), a stream
 Little River (Black River), a stream
 Southwest Branch of Saint-John River, a stream
 Les Etchemins Regional County Municipality (RCM)

Parish municipalities in Quebec
Incorporated places in Chaudière-Appalaches